Tempo Latino is a festival of salsa music and Latin music in Vic-Fezensac, France (at the end of July).

Artists invited

2008
24/7 : 
/ Ska Cubano (website: SkaCubano.com)
/ Roy Paci & Aretuska 
25/7: 
Yerba Buena 
 Latin Giants of Jazz (website:  LatinGiants.com) : 
26/7 :
/ Los Patriarcas de la Rumba(website: PatriarcasDeLaRumba.com)
 La 33
27/07 :
Dave Valentin's Tropics Heat
 Larry Harlow and Latin Legends of Fania

2007
26/07 : 
 Kékélé (Republic of Congo)
 Los Van Van (Yerba Buena canceled)
27/07 : 
 Maraca. Guests : Candido Fabre & Tiburon 
 Israel Lopez Cachao (Cuba/Miami)
28/07 : 
 Son Reinas (Japan)
 Yomo Toro (Puerto Rico)
29/07 : 
 Africando (Senegal, ...)
 Willie Colón (Spanish Harlem)
30/07 : 
 Manu Chao

2006

27/07 : 21 h 00
 Free Hole Negro (Cuba)
 Sergent Garcia (France - Cuba)
28/07 : 21 h 30 Special Porto Rico
 Son Boricua with Jose Mangual Jr & Jimmy Sabater (photos)
 Cheo Feliciano y Mercadonegro (photos)
 Samedi 29 juillet : 21 h 30 Special Porto Rico
 Son del Barrio Plena Libre (annulé) (photos)
 Bobby Valentín y su Orquesta (photos)
30/07 : 21 h 30
 La Charanga Contradanza (Toulouse) (photos)
 Oscar D'León (Venezuela) (photos)(video)

2005
 La Banda Municipal de Santiago photos - article sur le groupe
 Raul Paz photos
 Grupo Caribe photos 1, photos 2, commentaires
 Big 3 Palladium Orchestra : Tito Puente JR(Tito Puente's son, Machito JR (fils de Machito) & Tito Rodríguez JR (Tito Rodríguez's son) photos 1, photos 2
 Mangu photos
 Johnny Pacheco with Ismaël Miranda & Hector Casanova photos 1, photos 2, commentaires
 Son Reinas (Japan) Photos 1, photos 2,Video 1
 Orchestra de la Luz (Japan) photos 1, photos 2

Photo Gallery

2004
 Olga Guillot "la Reina del Bolero" photos
 Israël Lopez "Cachao" "El Maestro del Mambo"
 Fruko photos
 Yuri Buenaventura photos
 Manny Oquendo
 Spanish Harlem Orchestra photos
Los Soneros del Barrio photos
 Yerba Buena photos
 Amparanoïa photos

2003
 Macaco photos
 Orishas  photos
 Maraca photos & Afro Cuban Jazz Master, Featuring: Tata Güines - Giovanni Hidalgo et Changuito
 Cubanismo photos
 Plena Libre
 Richie Ray & Samuel Prieto
 Jimmy Bosch photos
 Oscar D'Léon photos
 Grupo Caribe photos
Tempo Latino 2003 photos

2002
 Omara Portuondo
 Orlando Lopez "Cachaito" Guest : Anga Diaz
 Maraca
 José Alberto "El Canario"
 Manolito y su Trabuco
Africando

2001
El Conjunto
 Chapottin y su Estellas
 The New Salsa All Stars, guests : Alfredo de la Fé, Jimmy Bosch, Giovanni Hidalgo, Dave Valentin & José Alberto "El Canario".
 Grupo Caribe
 El Gran Combo de Puerto Rico
Omar Sosa

2000
William Cepeda
La Sonora Ponceña
 Yuri Buenaventura
 Jimmy Bosch
 Orishas
 Sergent Garcia

1999
 Eddie Palmieri Orchestra, Guest : Alfredo de la Fé
 Israel Lopez "Cachao"
 Raul Paz
 Maraca y Otra Vision
 Jimmy Bosch
 Willie Colón
Camilo Azuquita
 Amparanoïa
 La Banda Municipal de Santiago

1998
 La Orquesta Aragón
 Manny Oquendo & Libre
Ernesto Tito Puentes
 Afro Cuban All Stars
 Oscar D'León
 Celia Cruz
 Mambomania

1997
 Yuri Buenaventura
 Adalberto Álvarez
A. Rodriguez
 Los Van Van
 Orlando Poleo
 Oscar D'León
 La Familia Valera Miranda
 Raul Paz

1996
Yanza
 Jóvenes Clásicos del Son
 Oscar D'León
 NG La Banda
 Compay Segundo
 Orlando Poleo
 La Familia Valera Miranda 
 Hidegar Maracay Salsa

1995
Latin Groove
 Azuquita
 NG La Banda
 Papo Lucca y la Sonora Poncena

1994
 Macaco
 Orishas
 Maraca et Afro Cuban Jazz Master featuring: Tata Güines, Giovanni Hidalgo et Changuito
 Cubanismo
 Plena Libre
 Richie Ray & Samuel Prieto
 Jimmy Bosch
 Oscar D'Léon
 Yuri Buenaventura

Official Site
http://www.tempo-latino.com

Salsa music
Gers
Tourist attractions in Gers
Music festivals in France